The Mercedes-Benz L 337 is a lorry made by Daimler-Benz, sold under the Mercedes-Benz brand. Introduced in March 1959, it was already discontinued in 1961, and replaced with the L 338. The L 337 is the first generation of Mercedes-Benz' heavy-duty "short-bonnet lorries", and has, in its default configuration, the "long" short bonnet, which is 300 mm longer than the typical Mercedes-Benz medium duty short-bonnet lorry's bonnet. Mercedes-Benz also offered the L 337 as a forward-control lorry, called the LP 337.

The L 337 was designed to comply with "Seebohm's legislation", which limited the maximum permissible total mass of lorries registered in West-Germany to 12,000 kg (plus another 12,000 kg of trailer mass). However, the L 337 was rendered obsolete by rescindment of this legislation in 1960.

Models 

L 337: Base model, offered either as a rolling chassis or with a flatbed
LK 337: Tipper lorry
LP 337: Forward control lorry
LS 337: Tractor
LPS 337: Forward control tractor

Description 

The L 337 is a two-axle lorry with a total permissible mass of 12,000 kg and rear-wheel drive. It has a ladder frame with U-profile longitudinal sections. At launch, Mercedes-Benz offered three different wheelbase options, (3700 mm, 4200 mm, and 4400 mm); in 1960, a 5000 mm option was added. The cab is either the long version of the short-bonnet lorry cab (L, LK models), or the short version of the forward-control cab (LP models). From 1960, Mercedes-Benz offered a long variant of the forward-control cab (LP models).

Both front and rear axles are beam axles. The front axle is a stub (dead) axle, the rear axle is a hypoid drive (live) axle. Usually, such axles do not have additional reduction gearboxes if used in large on-road lorries. However, the L 337's hypoid axle was fitted with an additional, pneumatically-shifted two-speed planetary gearbox, giving the lorry 5 × 2 = 10 forward gears. This design allowed Daimler-Benz to install their modular Daimler-Benz G 32 synchromesh five speed gearbox, which otherwise would not have had proper gear spreading. The clutch used to transmit the torque from the engine to the gearbox is a dry Fichtel & Sachs GF 50 KR BH single-disc clutch. The engine used in the L 337 is the naturally aspirated, straight-six OM 326IV Diesel engine. It is precombustion chamber injected, water-cooled, and rated 190 hp (SAE gross) / 172 PS; 127 kW (DIN 70020).

Technical specifications

See also 
List of Mercedes-Benz vehicles
List of Mercedes-Benz trucks

References 

Mercedes-Benz vehicles
Mercedes-Benz trucks